A diastema (plural diastemata, from Greek διάστημα, space) is a space or gap between two teeth. Many species of mammals have diastemata as a normal feature, most commonly between the incisors and molars. More colloquially, the condition may be referred to as gap teeth or tooth gap.

In humans, the term is most commonly applied to an open space between the upper incisors (front teeth).  It happens when there is an unequal relationship between the size of the teeth and the jaw. Diastemata are common for children and can exist in adult teeth as well.

In humans

Causes 
1. Oversized Labial Frenulum: Diastema is sometimes caused or exacerbated by the action of a labial frenulum (the tissue connecting the lip to the gum), causing high mucosal attachment and less attached keratinized tissue. This is more prone to recession or by tongue thrusting, which can push the teeth apart.

2. Periodontal Disease: Periodontal disease, also known as gum disease, can result in bone loss that supports the teeth. If a person loses enough bone, the teeth can become loose and cause gaps to form.

3. Mesiodens: Mesiodens is an extra tooth that grows behind your front teeth. If you have a mesiodens, it may push the front teeth apart to make room for itself thus creating a gap between the front teeth.

4. Skeletal discrepancy: Dental skeletal discrepancy can be a cause behind gap teeth. If the upper jaw grows more than the lower jaw, teeth on the upper jaw will have more space to cover thus leaving gaps between them.

5. Proclination: If your front teeth are angled forward, a small gap between them may appear huge. This is called proclination. Proclination can be a result of aggressive tongue thrusting.

Treatment 
1. Determining the cause of the diastema, then treat the cause.

2. Diastema treatment options can differ from one patient to another, but generally it is treated by orthodontics, or composite fillings, or a combination of veneers or crowns.

Historical and popular culture references 
In The Canterbury Tales, Geoffrey Chaucer wrote of the "gap-toothed wife of Bath". As early as this time period, the gap between the front teeth, especially in women, was associated with lustful characteristics. Thus, the implication in describing "the gap-toothed wife of Bath" is that she is a middle-aged woman with insatiable lust. This has no scientific basis, but it has been a common premise in folklore since the Middle Ages.

In Ghana, Namibia, Nigeria as well as throughout many communities in Kenya, diastemata are regarded as being attractive and a sign of fertility, and some people have even had them created through cosmetic dentistry. In France, they are called "dents du bonheur" ("lucky/happiness teeth"). This expression originated in Napoleon's time: when the Napoleonic army recruited, it was imperative that soldiers had incisors in perfect condition because they had to open the paper cartridges (containing powder and ball) with their teeth when loading their muskets. All those who had teeth apart were then classified as unfit to fight. Some men broke their own teeth to avoid going to war. Les Blank's Gap-Toothed Women (1987) is a 30-minute documentary film about diastematic women.

Famous people 

Some well-known people noted for having diastema include:

 Musicians: Madonna, Elton John, Seal, Amy Winehouse, Mac DeMarco, 50 Cent, Flea, Elvis Costello, Charley Pride, Ray Davies of The Kinks, Billy Preston, Ray Dorset of Mungo Jerry, Dave Brockie a.k.a. Oderus Urungus and guitarist Corey Smoot a.k.a. Flattus Maximus, both of GWAR, Melanie Martinez, Becky G, Laura Pausini, Edmund Sylvers, Hayley Williams,  Pharoahe Monch, guitarist Steve Howe, and singer Bobby Brown and his daughter Bobbi Kristina Brown.

 Models: Georgia May Jagger, Lauren Hutton, Lara Stone, Lily Aldridge, Slick Woods, Jessica Hart, Michele Achieng Opiyo and Lindsey Wixson.

 Actresses: Uzo Aduba, Anna Paquin, Vanessa Paradis, Brigitte Bardot, Jorja Fox, Eve Myles, Léa Seydoux, Amira Casar, Cécile de France, Béatrice Dalle, Anna Popplewell, Octavia Spencer, Aubrey Plaza and Shannen Doherty.
 Actors: Elijah Wood, Robert Morse,  Eddie Murphy, Samuel L. Jackson, Woody Harrelson, Willem Dafoe, Zac Efron (before veneers) Laurence Fishburne, Denis Leary, Arnold Schwarzenegger, former late night TV show host David Letterman, Ernest Borgnine, Terry-Thomas, Jemaine Clement, Jamaica's Keith 'Shebada' Ramsay, and antiques expert and TV personality Tim Wonnacott.
 Comedians: Jimmy Tarbuck "The Gap-Toothed Chuckle Chappy", Paul F. Tompkins, and Alan Carr.
 News anchors: American television news reporter and anchor Michelle Charlesworth and New Zealand television news anchor and actress Angela D'Audney.
 Athletes: American football players Michael Strahan and Patrick Mahomes; American football coach Vince Lombardi; association football player Ronaldo; boxer Mike Tyson; professional wrestler and former TNA World Heavyweight Champion Bobby Roode; Major League Baseball players Joe DiMaggio (closed) and Jimmy Rollins; French tennis player Yannick Noah; British Formula 1 World Champion Lewis Hamilton; Ukrainian boxer Oleksandr Usyk.
 Politicians and leaders: Former U.S. Secretary of State Condoleezza Rice, former Supreme Court Justice Sandra Day O'Connor, American politicians Stacey Abrams and Chesa Boudin, and, according to released photos, several of the children of Nicholas II of Russia.

References

Vertebrate anatomy
Human anatomy
Teeth
Developmental tooth pathology
Dentistry